Why Johnny Can't Add: The Failure of the New Math is a 1973 book by Morris Kline, in which the author severely criticized the teaching practices characteristic of the "New Math" fashion for school teaching, which were based on Bourbaki's approach to mathematical research, and were being pushed into schools in the United States. Reactions were immediate, and the book became a best seller in its genre and was translated into many languages.

References

Further reading

External links
Text on-line, with permission of the current copyright holders

Books about mathematics education
1973 non-fiction books